DHE can refer to:

 Dhe (Cyrillic)
 Dihydroergotamine
 Design Human Engineering, a methodology of psychological influence developed by Richard Bandler
 Diffie–Hellman key exchange, a method of exchanging cryptographic keys
 Dynamic hydrogen electrode, a reference electrode in electrochemistry
 DHE, a Spanish-dubbed movie channel which is broadcast in Latin America